The Louisville Metro Housing Authority is the government agency in Louisville, Kentucky that is charged with providing affordable housing and financial aid to homeowners and renters. It was formed in 2003 from the merger of the Housing Authority of Louisville and Jefferson County Housing Authority.

References

External links
 

Government of Louisville, Kentucky
Public housing in the United States
Government agencies established in 2003
2003 establishments in Kentucky